Tom Heardman (born 12 September 1995) is an English professional footballer who plays as a striker.

Career
Heardman began his career with Newcastle United and joined League Two side Hartlepool United on loan in August 2016. He made his professional debut on 27 September 2016 in a 1–1 draw with Luton Town. He joined Bury on a season-long loan in July 2017, but returned before the end of August.

At the end of 2017/18 season, Heardman was released by Newcastle United.

Career statistics

References

External links

1995 births
Living people
English footballers
English Football League players
Newcastle United F.C. players
Gateshead F.C. players
Hartlepool United F.C. players
Bury F.C. players
Association football forwards